New Zealand (NZ) is a country in the southwest Pacific Ocean.

NZ or nz may also refer to:

Transportation
Air New Zealand (IATA airline designator from 1978)
New Zealand National Airways Corporation (IATA airline designator 1947 to 1978)

Other uses
.nz, the internet country code top-level domain for New Zealand
Novaya Zemlya, an Arctic archipelago of Russia
Novozymes, a Danish biotech company, part of the Novo Group

See also
New Zealand (disambiguation)